The Columbus Country Club Mound is a Native American burial mound at the Columbus Country Club in Columbus, Ohio. The mound was created around 2,000 years ago by the Pre-Columbian Native American Adena culture. The site was added to the National Register of Historic Places in 1974.

Resources about the site, including its National Register of Historic Places nomination, are restricted under the Archaeological Resources Protection Act of 1979.

See also
 National Register of Historic Places listings in Columbus, Ohio

References

Adena culture
Archaeological sites in Ohio
Mounds in Ohio
History of Columbus, Ohio
Broad Street (Columbus, Ohio)